Keriaka ( Ramopa) is an East Papuan language of Bougainville, an island to the east of New Guinea.

References

Languages of the Autonomous Region of Bougainville
North Bougainville languages